The Battle of Rajgród  was a battle of the Kościuszko Uprising between the Polish–Lithuanian Commonwealth's rebel army and the Kingdom of Prussia which took place in Rajgród on 1794 July 10. Rebels using only the cold arms and without the heavy artillery were able to temporarily push out the Prussian army from the city.

References

Rajgrod
Rajgrod
Conflicts in 1794
Grajewo County